SM City Tarlac is a shopping mall owned by SM Prime Holdings. It is the first SM Supermalls in the province of Tarlac located in MacArthur Highway, Brgy. San Roque, Tarlac City, Tarlac, Philippines. SM City Tarlac was opened to the public on April 30, 2010 after almost 2 years of planning and construction.

Mall features
The  mall has four levels. Its exteriors are built with colored metal cladding, glass portion on the sides of the skylight allows natural light to flow into the mall without the creation of heat, resulting not only in brighter and more spacious, but also more environmentally friendly interiors, the mall also has four cinemas as well as amusement areas.

SM City Tarlac has a six-story building adjacent and connected to the mall with five levels exclusively for parking. It will have about 1,000 slots for parking – 800 for cars and the rest for motorcycle and jeepney parking.

References

Shopping malls in the Philippines
Shopping malls established in 2010
SM Prime
Buildings and structures in Tarlac City